The Ted Cruz–Zodiac Killer meme is an internet meme which circulated in 2015. A facetious conspiracy theory, the meme suggests that Ted Cruz, a United States senator and 2016 US presidential candidate, is the Zodiac Killer, an unidentified serial killer active in the late 1960s and early 1970s. Cruz, born in 1970, could not have committed these murders, which began before his birth. Circulators of the meme do not genuinely believe that he was the Zodiac Killer, citing the absurdity of its premise; NPR wrote that the meme captured "a feeling they have about Cruz: they think he's creepy. And they want to point that out, as clearly as they can."

Origin and spread

A January 2016 investigation by Miles Klee of The Daily Dot found the first use of the meme to be by a Twitter user in March 2013, as Cruz was speaking at the Conservative Political Action Conference and vowing to repeal the Affordable Care Act. The actual Tweet was, "Alert: Ted Cruz is speaking!! His speech is titled: 'This Is The Zodiac Speaking'" The meme was not repeated until November 2014, by another Twitter user writing about Cruz's proposal against net neutrality.

It continued in obscurity up to February 2016, when another Twitter user edited a picture of a Republican debate in order to include "Is Ted Cruz the Zodiac Killer?" in the interactive ticker at the bottom. That month, "is ted cruz the zodiac killer" was the second highest suggestion in Google's autocomplete for "is ted", but by April it was not in the autocomplete at all. News.com.au writer Matthew Dunn suggested that Google was censoring the search term, showing evidence that it accounted for 89% of total searches when compared to other terms in the autocomplete.

In April 2016, the Houston Chronicle said the meme "has a following. A Facebook group named for the meme has more than 27,000 members. A Google search turns up 621,000 hits, including exploratory articles by some of the biggest news publications on the web".

Cruz himself has jocularly alluded to the meme by tweeting one of the Zodiac Killer's cryptograms; first in October 2017 responding to a retweet from Senator Ben Sasse referring to Cruz as "the son of the guy who killed Kennedy" (a reference to a conspiracy theory involving Rafael Cruz) and then wishing a "Happy Halloween" in 2018. In December 2020, after the 340-character Zodiac cipher was cracked, Cruz retweeted an article about the cipher with the caption "uh oh".

In popular culture

After the edited image showing the question on Google trended, the meme spread into popular culture. Books about Cruz being the Zodiac Killer, including romantic ones, were listed on Amazon.com.

In February 2016, Public Policy Polling asked registered voters in Florida ahead of the Republican primary if they believed Cruz to be the Zodiac Killer; 10% believed and 28% were not sure. The other 62% did not think he was.

Comedian Larry Wilmore made references to the meme in his April 2016 routine at the White House Correspondents' Dinner, including a joke that Cruz was not campaigning to win the nomination, but to continue a murder spree.

The meme has been repeated, without disclaimer, in anti-Cruz opinion pieces in GQ and the Chicago Tribune.

In October of 2022, satirical news outlet The Babylon Bee produced a sketch as part of a series following the lives of two Californians who had moved to Texas. In the sketch titled 'Episode 3 - The Church' , the Californians are canvassing for Beto O'Rourke as part of the 2022 US midterm elections and Cruz answers the door. In response to the canvasers, Cruz states he is short on time having 'letters to write' before closing the door and inadvertently dropping one of the letters. The canvassers quickly flee after seeing that the letter is printed with a cypher. Ted Cruz plays himself in the video.

Reception
Lindsey Martin, a Twitter user who helped circulate the meme, told NPR that she did so because it is "so obviously untrue... if there was any way that it could possibly be true I would be scared to joke about it just because of the repercussions.” The Verge writer Kaitlyn Tiffany opined that some may consider the subject of the meme to be "distasteful and irresponsible, even dangerous". Leigh Alexander considered its spread an example of the growing political engagement of youth, writing that in such memes, "the political figure is exaggerated, his context made grotesque or fantastical, just as in traditional political cartooning." According to Lozano, the point of the meme is to "[demonize] his character". Heidi Cruz responded to the meme by stating that she has "been married to him for 15 years, and I know pretty well who he is, so it doesn't bother me at all. There's a lot of garbage out there".

See also
List of conspiracy theories
Zodiac Killer in popular culture

References

2016 United States presidential election in popular culture
Cultural depictions of the Zodiac Killer
Internet memes introduced in 2013
Political Internet memes
Satirical conspiracy theories
Ted Cruz